The Aero-Vederci Baby! Tour was a concert tour by American hard rock band Aerosmith. Road manager Tommy Higgins came up with the tour's title. At the time the tour was announced, it had been speculated that the tour would last for upwards of three years and be the band's final tour. However, the band went on to schedule a residency in 2019 and is expected to continue touring after that, but it remains unknown for how long. The tour started with a free show in Phoenix, Arizona, and took the band through Europe and South America. The band performed in the country of Georgia for the first time in their career. The final four shows of the tour were cancelled after lead singer Steven Tyler had health problems.

Tour dates

Cancelled dates

References

2017 concert tours
Aerosmith concert tours